Alphonse Lami (22 June 1822, Paris-17 July 1867, Alexandria) was a French sculptor and Egyptologist of Italian descent.

Life
He was the son of François Lami (illegitimate son of prince Francesco Borghese) and Louise Hélène Heim (granddaughter of Jean-Baptiste Nicolet. He joined the Ecole des Beaux-Arts on 7 October 1846, studying under Abel de Pujol and Francisque Duret. He first exhibited at the Paris Salon in 1850 with a marble statue entitled "Liseuse". He then went to Egypt where from 1852 to 1853 he took part in the excavation of the Serapeum of Saqqara, which were headed by his friend Auguste Mariette. Returning to Paris, he married Alexandrine-Marie Bidauld (granddaughter of the rural painter and member of the  Académie des Beaux-Arts Jean-Joseph-Xavier Bidauld) in 1853 - their son Stanislas Lami was a noted sculptor and art writer - and devoted himself to studying artistic anatomy and produced a flayed or écorche figure digging with a shovel, which he exhibited at the Salon in 1857. This work was also presented at the Académie des Sciences and was the report of an ecology written in the name of MM. Claude Bernard, Pierre Rayer, Horace Vernet and Jean Louis Armand de Quatrefages de Bréau. Later, in 1861, Lami published an album of engravings after this écorché under the title "Myologie superficielle du corps humain". Lami was made a knight of the Légion d'honneur on 12 August 1859.

In 1865, Alphonse Lami took part in the scientific commission sent to Mexico by the ministry of public instruction. Suffering from a liver disease he had caught from his stay in the tropics, he unwisely undertook a new trip to Egypt on his return to France from Mexico. He arrived in Alexandria when his condition suddenly worsened and he died there in July 1867.

Works 

 Bust of Michel Chevalier
 Liseuse, exhibited at the 1850 Salon
 L'Ecorché, exhibited at the 1857 Salon, Musée d'Anatomie de Montpellier

Sources

 Archives de la Seine.
 La Parentèle de Charles et Yvonne de Gaulle
 Dictionnaire des sculpteurs du XIX° siècle by Stanislas Lami.

1822 births
1867 deaths
French people of Italian descent
Alphonse
Chevaliers of the Légion d'honneur
19th-century French sculptors
French male sculptors